Allomyces strangulata is a species of fungus.

External links
 Mycobank entry
 Index Fungorum entry

References 

Fungi described in 1916
Blastocladiomycota